Harrad Summer is a 1974 film sequel to the 1973 film The Harrad Experiment, directed by Steven Hilliard Stern.

The film follows Harrad College students Stanley, Sheila, Harry, and Beth as they spend summer vacation together to get to know their families. Don Johnson and Bruno Kirby did not reprise their roles from the first film, while James Whitmore's character did not appear and Tippi Hedren's role from the original film was played by Emmaline Henry.

Cast
 Robert Reiser as Stanley Kolasukas
 Laurie Walters as Sheila Grove
 Richard Doran as Harry Schacht
 Victoria Thompson as Beth Hillyer
 Emmaline Henry as Margaret Tonhausen
 Bill Dana as Jack Schacht
 Marty Allen as Bert Franklin 
 Walter Brooke as Sam Grove

External links

1974 films
1970s teen drama films
American teen drama films
American sequel films
Films set in Massachusetts
Films directed by Steven Hilliard Stern
Films scored by Patrick Williams
Cinerama Releasing Corporation films
1974 drama films
1970s English-language films
1970s American films